The Azores Regional Election (1976) was an election held on 27 June 1976 for the first Legislative Assembly of the Portuguese Autonomous Region of the Azores.

Turnout was 67.51% (109,826 voted of the 162,677 registered participants), resulting in a victory of the Social Democratic Party led by Mota Amaral, who became the first President through election.

Background
Until the 19th century the administration of the Azores had been separated from the national government, and considered overseas territories. After 1895, the Azores and Madeira obtained their own level of administrative autonomy that was established in the Portuguese Constitution. In this form the islands began to function as autonomous districts, similar to the district Juntas Gerais, which continued until 1974. But, in practice, these communities were abandoned administratively, and had no means to improve development, resulting in immigration. Following the Carnation Revolution, from April 1974 until August 1975, the Azores continued as autonomous districts, until the Junta Governativa dos Açores was constituted under President General Altino de Magalhães and six other councilmen: 
 Dr. Henrique Aguiar Rodrigues (PPD), to handle Assuntos Sociais, Trabalho e Emigração (Social Issues, Work and Immigration);
 Dr. José Adriano Borges de Carvalho, (later substituted by Dr. Álvaro Monjardino) (PPD), as the coordinator of the Coordenação Económica e Finanças (Economic Coordination and Finances);
 José Pacheco de  Almeida (PPD), to run Transportes, Comércio, Comunicações e Turismo (Transport, Commerce, Communication and Tourism);
 Eng. José António Martins Goulart (PS), in the role of Educação, Investigação Científica, Comunicação Social e Cultural (Education, Scientific Investigation, Social Communication and Culture);
 Engº Leonildo Garcia Vargas (PS), in Administração Local, Equipamento Social e Ambiente (Local Administration, Social Equipment and Environment);
 Dr. António de Albuquerque Jácome Corrêa, to administer Agricultura, Pescas e Indústria (Agriculture, Fishing and Industry)
The Junta Governantiva which was named on 22 August 1975 constituted a provisional government, that tried to respond to several of the post-Revolution problems, and to prepare a proposal for the first Politico-Administrative Statute for the Autonomous Region of the Azores.

Political parties
 Democratic and Social Centre (CDS)
 Movement of Socialist Left (MES)
 Portuguese Communist Party (PCP)
 Communist Party of the Portuguese Workers (PCTP/MRPP)
 Socialist Party (PS)
 Social Democratic Party (PSD)

Distribution of MPs by constituency
The following table contains the number of seats that each constituency can elect.

Summary of votes and seats

|- 
! rowspan="2" colspan=2 style="background-color:#E9E9E9" align=left|Parties
! rowspan="2" style="background-color:#E9E9E9" align=right|Votes
! rowspan="2" style="background-color:#E9E9E9" align=right|%
! colspan="2" style="background-color:#E9E9E9" align="center"|Seats
|- style="background-color:#E9E9E9"
! style="background-color:#E9E9E9" align=right|1976
! style="background-color:#E9E9E9" align=right|%
|-
| 
|59,114||53.83||27||62.79
|-
| 
|36,049||32.82||14||32.56
|-
| 
|8,291||7.55||2||4.65
|-
| 
|2,387||2.17||0||0.00
|-
| 
|638||0.58||0||0.00
|-
|style="width: 10px" bgcolor=#FF0000 align="center" | 
|align=left|Movement of Socialist Left
|167||0.15||0||0.00
|-
|colspan=2 align=left style="background-color:#E9E9E9"|Total valid 
|width="50" align="right" style="background-color:#E9E9E9"|106,646
|width="40" align="right" style="background-color:#E9E9E9"|97.10
|width="40" align="right" style="background-color:#E9E9E9"|43
|width="40" align="right" style="background-color:#E9E9E9"|100.00
|-
|colspan=2|Blank ballots
|1,304||1.19||colspan=2 rowspan=4|
|-
|colspan=2|Invalid ballots
|1,876||1.71
|-
|colspan=2 align=left style="background-color:#E9E9E9"|Total
|width="50" align="right" style="background-color:#E9E9E9"|109,826
|width="40" align="right" style="background-color:#E9E9E9"|100.00
|-
|colspan=2|Registered voters/turnout
||162,677||67.51
|-
| colspan=6 align=left | Source: Comissão Nacional de Eleições
|}

References
Notes

External links
Comissão Nacional de Eleições
Legislative Assembly of Azores - Official website

See also
1976 Madeira regional election

1976 elections in Portugal
Azores 1976